John Brockman (born February 16, 1941) is an American literary agent and author specializing in scientific literature.  He established the Edge Foundation, an organization that brings together leading edge thinkers across a broad range of scientific and technical fields. 

Brockman was born to immigrants of Polish-Jewish descent in a poor Irish Catholic enclave of Boston, Massachusetts. Expanding on C.P. Snow's "two cultures", he introduced the "third culture" consisting of "those scientists and other thinkers in the empirical world who, through their work and expository writing, are taking the place of the traditional intellectual in rendering visible the deeper meanings of our lives, redefining who and what we are." 

He led a scientific salon for 20 years, asking an annual question to a host of renowned scientists and publishing their answers in book form, which he decided to symbolically close down in 2018.

He is an editor of Edge.org.

Association with Jeffrey Epstein
In an interview with Prince Andrew dated November 17, 2019, BBC reporter Emily Maitlis mentioned that both Andrew and John Brockman attended an intimate dinner at child sex trafficker Jeffrey Epstein’s mansion to celebrate Epstein’s release from prison for charges which stemmed from at least one decade of child sex trafficking. 

Andrew’s presence at Jeffrey Epstein’s Manhattan mansion was corroborated by Brockman himself, in emails published in an October 2019 New Republic report. The story suggested that Brockman was the “intellectual enabler” of Jeffrey Epstein, the financier who died in August 2019 while again awaiting trial on charges related to sex trafficking.

Brockman's famous literary dinners—held during the TED Conference—were, for a number of years after Epstein’s conviction, almost entirely funded by Epstein as documented in his annual tax filings. This allowed Epstein to mingle with scientists, startup icons and other tech billionaires.

Quotes
"Traditional American intellectuals are, in a sense, increasingly reactionary, and quite often proudly (and perversely) ignorant of many of the truly significant intellectual accomplishments of our time."
"Throughout history, only a small number of people have done the serious thinking for everybody."

Bibliography 

(1969) By the Late John Brockman
(1970) 37
(1973) "Afterwords: Explorations of the Mystical Limits of Contemporary Reality"
(1988) Doing Science: The Reality Club 
(1995) The Third Culture: Beyond the Scientific Revolution
(1996) Digerati: Encounters with the Cyber Elite
(1996) How Things Are: A Science Tool-Kit for the Mind (edited by John Brockman and Katinka Matson), Harper Perennial
(2002) The Next Fifty Years: Science in the First Half of the Twenty-First Century
(2003) The New Humanists: Science at the Edge
(2004) Curious Minds : How a Child becomes a Scientist (edited by John Brockman), New York: Pantheon Books
(2006) What We Believe but Cannot Prove: Today's Leading Thinkers on Science in the Age of Certainty
(2006) Intelligent Thought: Science Versus the Intelligent Design Movement
(2007) What Is Your Dangerous Idea?: Today's Leading Thinkers on the Unthinkable
(2007) What Are You Optimistic About?: Today's Leading Thinkers on Why Things Are Good and Getting Better
(2009) What Have You Changed Your Mind About?: Today's Leading Minds Rethink Everything. 150 high-powered thinkers discuss their most telling missteps and reconsiderations with Alan Alda, Brian Eno, Ray Kurzweil, Irene Pepperberg, Steven Pinker, Lisa Randall etc.
(2009) This Will Change Everything: Ideas That Will Shape the Future (with Patrick Bateson, Oliver Morton, Stephen Schneider, Stewart Brand, Brian Eno, K. Eric Drexler, and others)
(2011) Culture: Leading Scientists Explore Societies, Art, Power, and Technology
(2011) "Is the Internet Changing the Way You Think?: The Net's Impact on Our Minds and Future" 
(2012) "This Will Make You Smarter: New Scientific Concepts to Improve Your Thinking"
(2013) "This Explains Everything: Deep, Beautiful, and Elegant Theories of How the World Works"
(2014) "What Should We Be Worried About?: The Hidden Threats Nobody Is Talking About"
(2015) "This Idea Must Die: Scientific Theories that are Blocking Progress(2015) "What to Think About Machines That Think: Today's Leading Thinkers on the Age of Machine Intelligence
(2016) "Know This: Today's Most Interesting and Important Scientific Ideas, Discoveries, and Developments"
(2017) "This Idea is Brilliant: Lost, Overlooked, and Underappreciated Scientific Concepts Everyone Should Know"
(2019) Possible Minds: Twenty-Five Ways of Looking at AI (edited by John Brockman)

References

Further reading
 Cultural Studies versus the "Third Culture". Slavoj Žižek. The South Atlantic Quarterly, Vol 101, No 1, pages 19–32 (2002). (article)
 Counterculture, Cyberculture, and the Third Culture: Reinventing Civilization, Then and Now. Lee Worden. West of Eden: Communes and Utopia in Northern California, Iain Boal, Janferie Stone, Michael Watts, Cal Winslow (eds.), pages 199–221. (Oakland, 2012).
 The "Third Culture Intellectuals" and Charles Darwin. Pascal Fischer. Anglistentag Konstanz 2013: Proceedings (XXXV), pages 71-80 (2014). (article)
 Neurohistory Is Bunk?: The Not-So-Deep History of the Postclassical Mind. Max Stadler. Isis, Vol 105, No 1, pages 133-144 (2014). (article)
 Network Celebrity: Entrepreneurship and the New Public Intellectuals. Fred Turner. Christine Larson. Public Culture, Vol 27, No 1, pages 53-84 (2015) (article)

External links

John Brockman
Brockman's taste for Science or how to entertain the smartest people
Guardian Interview
John Brockman at HuffPost
"So What Happens After Happenings?", New York Times, September 4, 1966
John Brockman: 40 years of "intermedia kinetic environments"

1941 births
Living people
Literary agents
American science writers
Writers from Boston
American male non-fiction writers
20th-century American male writers
20th-century American non-fiction writers
21st-century American male writers
21st-century American non-fiction writers
HuffPost writers and columnists